Seminole Towne Center is a super-regional enclosed mall located in Sanford, Florida,  north of Orlando at the intersection of I-4 and SR 417. It has  of gross leasable space. Current anchors are JCPenney, Dillard's, Dick's Sporting Goods, & Elev8 Fun, With 2 vacant anchors which are the former Macy's & Burlington

History
The mall opened in 1995 with Dillard's, JCPenney, Sears, Burdines, and Parisian (became McRae's in 2004 and Belk in 2006 instead of becoming Belk in 2007 like most of the other Parisian stores including The Avenues). Following that store's closure in 2010, the space is now Burlington (Closed in 2022) and Dick's Sporting Goods since 2012. Dillard's also opened a store at Pembroke Lakes Mall by the time of the mall's opening, while Parisian opened another Florida store at The Avenues a year before. Ivey's (who also wanted to open at The Avenues and The Florida Mall) and Maison Blanche (which was to build stores at Westfield Brandon and Westfield Citrus Park) have also signed as anchors. However, Dillard's purchased Ivey's and Maison Blanche was taken over by Gayfers, which never opened there. This created an available anchor pad that never came into fruition.

On May 8, 2009, Orlando Business Journal reported the coming addition of a  H&M store, which was the second in Florida, with the first being at The Florida Mall. Additionally, Sears closed the lower level of its anchor store at the center in 2012 and that space is yet to be filled. Also in 2012, Disney Store shuttered its doors at the mall. Simon sold the mall to Washington Prime Group in May 2014. In 2015,  of retail space near Macy's was cleared and converted into an Athletic Apex health club, which opened in 2016.

On May 31, 2018, Sears announced that its store would be closing as part of a plan to close 63 stores nationwide. The store closed on September 2, 2018. On January 7, 2020, it was announced that Macy's would be closing in April 2020 as a part of a plan to close 125 stores nationwide, The store permanently closed in March 2020, a month before its official date due to the COVID-19 Pandemic. Washington Prime Group transferred the mall's ownership to Kohan Retail Investment Group in March 2020. Victoria's Secret closed in June 2020 due to the COVID-19 Pandemic.

A&W Restaurants, H&M & Chick-fil-A all permanently closed from January to April 2021. And in June 2021, the former Macy's was purchased by The Altman Companies as part of redevelopment plans. The former Sears has been converted into a 2-story amusement center, operated by Elev8 Fun, which opened in January 2022.

Aeropostale, AT&T, Burlington, Claire's, Hollister Co.,  LensCrafters, PacSun, Taco Bell, Talbots,  The Children's Place, T-Mobile, and Tillys all closed in 2022.

Anchors
 Dick's Sporting Goods (2012–present) (formerly Parisian/McRae's/Belk)
 Dillard's (1995–present) (original anchor)
 Elev8 Fun (2022–present) (formerly Sears)
 JCPenney (1995–present) (original anchor)

Former anchors
 Belk (2006-2010) (formerly Parisian/McRae's, closed 2010, became Burlington/Dick's in 2012)
 Burdines (1995-2005) (original anchor, became Macy's in 2005, which closed in 2020)
 Burlington (2012–2022) (formerly Parisian/McRae's/Belk, closed in September 2022)
 H&M (2009-2021) (opened 2009, closed 2021)
 Macy's (2005-2020) (formerly Burdines, closed March 2020, vacant)
 McRae's (2004-2006) (formerly Parisian, became Belk in 2006, then Burlington/Dick's in 2012)
 Parisian (1995-2004) (original anchor, became McRae's in 2004, then Belk in 2006, then Burlington and Dick's in 2012)
 Sears (1995-2018) (original anchor, closed lower level in 2012, full store closed on September 2, 2018, now Elev8 Fun)

References

Shopping malls in Florida
Buildings and structures in Seminole County, Florida
Kohan Retail Investment Group
Shopping malls established in 1995
Tourist attractions in Seminole County, Florida
1995 establishments in Florida
Sanford, Florida